Billie Smedts (born 8 June 1992) is a former professional Australian rules footballer who played for the Geelong Football Club and Carlton Football Club in the Australian Football League (AFL). He was recruited by Geelong with their first pick and fifteenth overall in the 2010 national draft. He hails from Warrnambool and played in the TAC Cup for the Geelong Falcons.  He made his AFL debut for Geelong in the opening round of the 2012 AFL season against  at Patersons Stadium. At the conclusion of the 2016 season, he was traded to Carlton. He made his first senior appearance for the Carlton Football Club in the Round 1, 43-point loss to Richmond at the MCG.

Smedts played nine senior games in his first season with Carlton. He struggled to make a consistent impact and was delisted at the end of the year.

AFL football can be a demanding physical game, Smedts suffered breaking a leg twice, a broken collarbone and a shoulder reconstruction during his career.

Statistics
Statistics are correct to the end of the 2016 season

|- style="background-color: #EAEAEA"
! scope="row" style="text-align:center" | 2011
|
| 2 || 0 || — || — || — || — || — || — || — || — || — || — || — || — || — || —
|-
! scope="row" style="text-align:center" | 2012
|
| 2 || 14 || 6 || 9 || 94 || 72 || 166 || 43 || 40 || 0.4 || 0.6 || 6.7 || 5.1 || 11.9 || 3.1 || 2.9
|- style="background-color: #EAEAEA"
! scope="row" style="text-align:center" | 2013
|
| 2 || 13 || 12 || 8 || 75 || 65 || 140 || 40 || 40 || 0.9 || 0.6 || 5.8 || 5.0 || 10.8 || 3.1 || 3.1
|-
! scope="row" style="text-align:center" | 2014
|
| 2 || 6 || 0 || 0 || 34 || 23 || 57 || 15 || 8 || 0.0 || 0.0 || 5.7 || 3.8 || 9.5 || 2.5 || 1.3
|- style="background-color: #EAEAEA"
! scope="row" style="text-align:center" | 2015
|
| 2 || 4 || 0 || 0 || 19 || 23 || 42 || 16 || 11 || 0.0 || 0.0 || 4.8 || 5.8 || 10.5 || 4.0 || 2.8
|-
! scope="row" style="text-align:center" | 2016
|
| 2 || 1 || 1 || 0 || 5 || 11 || 16 || 3 || 1 || 1.0 || 0.0 || 5.0 || 11.0 || 16.0 || 3.0 || 1.0
|-
! scope="row" style="text-align:center" | 2017
|
| 16 || 9 || 1 || 3 || 44 || 47|| 91 || 20|| 32 || 0.1 || 0.3 || 4.9 || 5.2 || 10.1 || 2.2 || 3.5
|-|- class="sortbottom"
! colspan=3| Career
! 47
! 20
! 20
! 271
! 241
! 512
! 137
! 132
! 0.4
! 0.4
! 6.0
! 5.1
! 10.9
! 2.9
! 2.9
|}

References

External links

Geelong Football Club players
Living people
1992 births
Geelong Falcons players
Australian rules footballers from Victoria (Australia)
Australian people of Dutch descent
Australian people of Scottish descent
People educated at Geelong Grammar School
Carlton Football Club players
Preston Football Club (VFA) players